"Stenoplastis" carderi is a moth of the family Notodontidae first described by Herbert Druce in 1899. It is found in Colombia.

Taxonomy
The species probably does not belong in Stenoplastis, but has not been placed in another genus yet.

References

Moths described in 1899
Notodontidae of South America